This was the first edition of the tournament.

Liam Broady won the title after defeating Marc-Andrea Hüsler 7–5, 6–3 in the final.

Seeds

Draw

Finals

Top half

Bottom half

References

External links
Main draw
Qualifying draw

Challenger Biel/Bienne - 1